This is a list of stock short titles that are used for legislation in one or more of the countries where short titles are used. It is also a list of articles that list or discuss legislation by short title or subject.

Act of Uniformity
Administration of Justice Act
Agricultural Holdings Act
Appellate Jurisdiction Act
Appropriation Act
Armed Forces Act
Atomic Energy Act
Atomic Energy Authority Act
Bank of England Act
Bank Notes Act
Bankruptcy Act
Beerhouse Act
Births and Deaths Registration Act
Bridges Act
British Museum Act
British Nationality Act
British North America Act
British Subjects Act
Broadcasting Act
Building Societies Act
Burial Act
Children Act
Church Building Act
Coinage Act
Coinage Offences Act
Commons Act
Communications Act
Companies Act
Consolidated Fund Act
Contagious Diseases (Animals) Act
Copyright Act
Coroners Act
County Courts Act
Court of Session Act
Crimes Act
Criminal Justice Act
Criminal Law Act
Criminal Law Amendment Act
Criminal Procedure Act
Crown Lands Act
Defamation Act
Defence Act
Diseases of Animals Act
Dogs Act
East India Company Act
Ecclesiastical Commissioners Act
Ecclesiastical Courts Act
Education Act
Employment Relations Act
Entail Act
Evidence Act
Factory Act
Fatal Accidents Act
Finance Act
Finance Act (India)
Firearms Act
Fisheries Act
Forcible Entry Act
Forgery Act
Friendly Societies Act
Government Annuities Act
Greenwich Hospital Act
Health and Social Care Act
Highway Act
House of Commons Disqualification Act
Housing Act
Human Fertilisation and Embryology Act
Human Rights Act
Immigration Act
Inclosure Act
Income Tax Act
Indemnity Act 
Infanticide Act
International Copyright Act
Interpretation Act
Isle of Man (Customs) Act
Judicature Act
Juries Act
Justices of the Peace Act
Land Act
Land Drainage Act
Land Purchase Act
Land Registration Act
Landlord and Tenant Act
Larceny Act
Law of Property Act
Law Reform Act
Libel Act
Licensing Act
Limitation Act
Local Government Act
Lunacy Act
Magistrates' Courts Act
Marriage Act
Matrimonial Causes Act
Medical Act
Mental Health Act
Merchant Shipping Act
Metropolitan Police Act
Militia Act
Misuse of Drugs Act
Municipal Corporations Act
National Debt Act
National Heritage Act
National Security Act
Northern Ireland Act
Oaths Act
Obscene Publications Act
Offences Against the Person Act
Offences at Sea Act
Official Information Act
Official Secrets Act
Parliament Act
Parliamentary Costs Act
Patent Act
Penal Servitude Act
Petroleum Act
Piracy Act
Police Act
Poor Relief Act
Post Office Act
Postal Services Act
Prevention of Corruption Act
Prison Act
Protection of Children Act
Public Health Act
Public Libraries Act
Public Order Act
Public Schools Act
Public Works Act
Queen Anne's Bounty Act
Railways Act
Regency Act
Representation of the People Act
Revenue Act
Riot Act
Sale of Goods Act
Sedition Act
Settled Land Act
Sexual Offences Act
Short Titles Act
Slave Trade Act
Solicitors Act
Stamp Act
Statute Law (Repeals) Act
Statute Law Revision Act
Statute Revision Act
Superannuation Act
Supreme Court of Judicature Act
Telecommunications Act
Telegraph Act
Theft Act
Tithe Act
Town and Country Planning Act
Trade Union Act
Trading with the Enemy Act
Tramways Act
Treason Act
Truck Act
Trusts Act
Weights and Measures Act
Welfare Reform Act
Wills Act
Wireless Telegraphy Act
Witchcraft Act
Universities Act
Unlawful Oaths Act
Vaccination Act
Visiting Forces Act

See also
List of legislation named for a person
List of legislation named for a place

References
"Alphabetical Table of Statutes". Current Law Statutes. 
"Alphabetical Table of Statutes, Measures, Orders, Etc". Halsbury's Statutes of England. 
"Alphabetical Table of Statutes and Rules Selected". Chitty's Statutes of Practical Utility. 
Craies and Hardcastle. "Popular or Short Titles of Statutes". Treatise on the Construction and Effect of Statute Law. 2nd Ed. 1892. p 604.
"Alphabetical Table of Statutes". Juta's Statutes of South Africa. 
"Alphabetical Table of Statutes". The Statutes of New South Wales. 
"Alphabetical Table of Statutes". Statutes of Saskatchewan. 

Short titles